TPB or Tpb may stand for:

Media

Literature
 Trade paperback (disambiguation)

Films
 TPB AFK, a 2013 film about The Pirate Bay trial

Television
 Trailer Park Boys, a Canadian mockumentary television series

Internet
 The Pirate Bay, an Internet index of links to files

Organizations
 Transit Planning Board, Atlanta and Georgia, US
 Transports publics biennois, a public transport operator in Biel/Bienne, Switzerland
 Town Planning Board, Hong Kong

Other
 Theory of planned behavior
 Tetraphenyl butadiene, an electroluminescent dye
 Triple phase boundary, in a fuel cell, etc.